Johan Elsness (born 27 February 1947) is Professor of English language at the University of Oslo, Norway.

References

1947 births
Living people
Deputy members of the Storting
Conservative Party (Norway) politicians
Østfold politicians
Academic staff of the University of Oslo